The 2A Continental Architectural Awards is an architecture award, organized by 2A Magazine to recognize and honor an individual or a group’s contribution to the world of architecture.

Award categories
The award is presented under eight categories
Residential
Commercial (Office & Business, Retail, and wholesale, Production)
Public (Sport & Leisure, Education, Hospitality, Culture, Mixed Use, Health,
Religion, Civic, Transportation), and community-based projects
Urban Projects, Rural Projects, Landscape & Public Spaces (including squares and streets)
Old and New (Reuse and adaptation, Renovation, Restoration, Regeneration)
Interior Architecture
Future Projects / Innovative Designs

History

2015
The first Award event was held in Istanbul, Turkey, with the Istanbul Technical University being the main Academic partner. The other technical partners were The UNESCO, Istanbul Bilgi University and Research Institute of Cultural Heritage and Tourism of Iran. Its theme was “The Emergence of Contemporary Architecture in Asia.” The Jury members consisted of Sinan Mert Sener, Seung H-Sang, Romi Khosla, and Yavuz Selim Sepin.

2016
The second 2A Continental Architectural Award event was held at Vienna, Austria in association with Academy of Fine Arts Vienna. This year’s theme was “Innovative Architecture in Asia.” The Jury consisted of some fine architects including Volkwin Marg, Nasrine Seraji, Wolfgang Tschapeller, Murat Tabanlıoğlu, Françoise Fromonot and Hiromi Hosoya.

2017
The 2017 2A Awards event took place in Berlin, Germany and was themed “Innovative Architecture in Various Continents.” Seated on the Jury were renowned architects Ulrike Lauber, Hubert Neinhoff, and Sergei Tchoban.

2018 

The awards ceremony was held at Institute for Advanced Architecture of Catalonia with the theme "Innovative Contextual Architecture in Asia and Europe". Jury composed of Carme Pinós, Yoko Okuyama, Abbas Gharib, Willy Müller and Ali Basbous.

2019 

The awards for Asia-Oceania, Europe, Africa, South Central, and North America was held at Polytechnic University of Madrid under the theme "Innovative Contextual Architecture in the Continents".

2020 

The award was organised online due to the COVID-19 pandemic. Jury members included Bahram Shirdel, Silja Tillner, Donald Bates, Antoine Guiraud and Asako Yamamoto.

Administration
Ahmad Zohadi is the founder, organizer and director of 2A Continental Architectural Awards organised since 2015. He is the CEO and editor-in-chief of 2A Magazine, also the founder and chief editor of ‘Architecture & Construction’, a persian quarterly magazine, published since 2003, and distributed in Iran.

References

Awards established in 2015
Architecture awards
Design awards